Derek Alexander Boswell (born 16 February 1962) is a Scottish born international lawn bowler from Jersey.

Bowls career
Boswell represented Jersey at the 2006 Commonwealth Games, 2010 Commonwealth Games and the 2018 Commonwealth Games

In 2007 he won the pairs and fours silver medals at the Atlantic Bowls Championships. Two years later he won the fours bronze medal at the 2009 Atlantic Championships and in 2019 he won the fours silver medal and pairs bronze medal at the Atlantic Championships.

In 2020, he was selected for the 2020 World Outdoor Bowls Championship in Australia and in October 2021, he was selected to represent Jersey in the 2022 Commonwealth Games being held in Birmingham. He duly competed in the men's pairs and the men's fours at the Games.

References

External links
 
 
 
 

1962 births
Living people
Jersey bowls players
Bowls players at the 2006 Commonwealth Games
Bowls players at the 2010 Commonwealth Games
Bowls players at the 2018 Commonwealth Games
Bowls players at the 2022 Commonwealth Games